Reverse lookup is a procedure of using a value to retrieve a unique key in an associative array.

Applications of reverse lookup include 

 reverse DNS lookup, which provides the domain name associated with a particular IP address, 
 reverse telephone directory, which provides the name of the entity associated with a particular telephone number,
 reverse image search, which provides similar images to the one provided.

See also 
 Inverse function
 Reverse dictionary

References

Arrays